Judo at the 2010 Asian Para Games was held in Huagong Gymnasium, Guangzhou, China from December 14 to 17, 2010.

Medal summary

Medal table
Retrieved from Asian Para Games 2010 Official Website.

Medalists

Men

Women

Results

Men

−60 kg
December 14

−66 kg
December 15

−73 kg
December 15

−81 kg
December 15

−90 kg
December 17

−100 kg
December 17

+100 kg
December 17

Women

−48 kg
December 14

−52 kg
December 14

−57 kg
December 15

−63 kg
December 15

−70 kg
December 16

References

External links
 

2010 Asian Para Games events
Asian Para Games
2010
Judo competitions in China